Fırat Karagöllü (born 7 February 1978) is a Turkish boxer. He competed in the men's light middleweight event at the 2000 Summer Olympics.

References

1978 births
Living people
Turkish male boxers
Olympic boxers of Turkey
Boxers at the 2000 Summer Olympics
Place of birth missing (living people)
Light-middleweight boxers
Competitors at the 2001 Mediterranean Games
Mediterranean Games silver medalists for Turkey
Mediterranean Games medalists in boxing